{{DISPLAYTITLE:Kappa2 Sagittarii}}

Kappa2 Sagittarii (κ2 Sagittarii) is a binary star system in the zodiac constellation of Sagittarius. It is visible to the naked eye with a combined apparent visual magnitude of +5.64. Based upon an annual parallax shift of 10.47 mas as seen from Earth, this system is located around 310 light years from the Sun. They are receding with a radial velocity of +2.6 km/s.

This is a visual binary system with the components orbiting each other over a period of roughly 700 years, having an eccentricity of 0.4 and a semimajor axis of 2 arc seconds. The pair have a combined spectral type that matches an A-type main sequence star with a stellar classification of A5 V. The individual components are of estimated types A1 and A6. The primary member, component A, is a magnitude 6.04 star with 1.85 times the mass of the Sun. It is radiating 38 times the Sun's luminosity from its photosphere at an effective temperature of about 7,990 K. The companion, component B, is visual magnitude 7.12.

There are two visual companions: component C is a magnitude 14.3 star at an angular separation of 18.6 arc seconds along a position angle of 266°, as of 2000; component D is magnitude 14.0 with a separation of 29.8 arc seconds along a position angle of 219°, also as of 2000.

References

A-type main-sequence stars
Binary stars
Sagittarii, Kappa
Sagittarius (constellation)
Durchmusterung objects
193807
100591
7787